What on Earth is a Canadian television panel game show and discussion program which aired on CBC Television from 1971 to 1975. It was based on the 1959 CBC game show Who Knows?

Premise
The series featured items from the Royal Ontario Museum, the Ontario Science Centre and other facilities. These were brought before a panel who attempted to identify the objects. After the object's identity was guessed or revealed, it was the subject of further conversation by participants.

Scheduling

This half-hour series was broadcast as follows (times in Eastern):

Episodes were rebroadcast from July to September 1971, in June 1975 and from May to August 1977.

References

External links
 

CBC Television original programming
1971 Canadian television series debuts
1975 Canadian television series endings
1970s Canadian game shows
Panel games